Peyton is an unincorporated town, a post office, and a census-designated place (CDP) located in and governed by El Paso County, Colorado, United States. The CDP is a part of the Colorado Springs, CO Metropolitan Statistical Area. The Peyton post office has the ZIP Code 80831. At the United States Census 2010, the population of the Peyton CDP was 214, while the population of the 80831 ZIP Code Tabulation Area was 21,993 including adjacent areas.

The nearby unincorporated area of Falcon also uses zip code 80831. Peyton and towns such as Falcon, Calhan, Ramah, Simla, and Matheson straddle U.S. Highway 24 between Colorado Springs and Limon, Colorado where US 24 intersects with Interstate 70.

History
Peyton was settled by George Peyton in 1888 and was surveyed and platted on December 25 
of that year. Originally called Mayfield, the settlement was renamed Peyton after the post office 
had been refused under that name because there was already a Mayfield, California.

Among the first settlers of Peyton were James and Susan McDermott.  With the coming of the Rock Island Railroad they settled in Calhan in 1888 and in 1890 moved to Peyton where Mr. McDermott was the first postmaster and ran a general store for 25 years.  His home, which still stands at the southwest corner of Main and Front Streets, was a popular boarding house.

A few years later, Russell Gates opened a mercantile store. He had previously established 
general stores in Limon, Calhan, Eastonville, Elbert 
and Elizabeth, Colorado. These enterprises 
carried everything from pins to coffins plus running a creamery. The store closed in 1920. At 
one time, there were five general stores in Peyton, one of which also sold gasoline.

By 1900, 50 people lived in Peyton. While farming and coal mining comprised the main 
occupation, supporting services included a blacksmith, physician, general store, creamery, 
hotel, and clergy. Joseph Zimmerman built a hall above a storage building attached to the Gates 
store. This meeting place hosted Odd Fellows, Modern Woodmen, elections, community 
dances, and fundraising events.

The first telephone in Peyton arrived in 1904. It ran on a dry cell battery and had a crank to turn 
to get your party. Telephone lines ran as the top strand on the barbed wire fences. Eventually, 
the area had enough phones that a central switchboard was installed. Mrs. George Hayes 
became the switchboard operator until 1922.

In 1923, a devastating fire took out several buildings, a number of automobiles and the stock in 
a general store. The town rebuilt and by the 1930s boasted 13 businesses.

In 1945, the original railroad depot was torn down and replaced with a new one. Ten years later, 
that depot was no longer needed, and the railroad sold it to the Methodist Church in 1958. They 
tore it down and used the materials for an addition to their church.

When the school house burned down in 1954, Peyton residents were alarmed that they didn't have their own fire protection. A group of people met at the Grange Hall and created the Peyton Volunteer Fire Department. The town chose their board members and Clarence Cook became the first Fire Chief. A few months later, by-laws were drawn up and regular meetings established. To support their activities, the Department held benefits such as dances or street carnivals. Eventually, they raised enough money to build a fire station. The department continues today as an all volunteer department.

In June 1965, a flood badly damaged the railroad tracks in the Peyton area. The water washed 
out 500 feet of fill beneath the track, leaving it suspended in mid-air. The flood also damaged 
the underpass east of Peyton by taking out several tons of concrete supports leaving that track 
several feet above the original road base. It took county, state, and railroad crews working 
double shifts to make the necessary repairs to make the tracks operational again.

Geography

Demographics

Arts and culture

 The Black Squirrel Creek Bridge, a property formerly listed on the National Register of Historic Places, was located between Peyton and Falcon, Colorado. The bridge was dismantled and replaced in 2012.
 The Homestead Ranch Regional Park is located in Peyton with facilities that include a playground and hiking trails.

Education
Students are served by Peyton School District 23JT in the Peyton area and by Falcon School District 49 in the Falcon area and nearby areas of Colorado Springs.

Notable people
 Lisa Joann Thompson, dancer and actress, In Living Color, Fame L.A., and Motown Live, lived for five years of her early childhood in Peyton in the mid 1970s, before moving to California.
 Kalen Ballage, NFL running back (2018–present), born in Peyton and attended Falcon High School.

See also

Outline of Colorado
Index of Colorado-related articles
State of Colorado
Colorado cities and towns
Colorado census designated places
Colorado counties
El Paso County, Colorado
Colorado metropolitan areas
Front Range Urban Corridor
South Central Colorado Urban Area
Colorado Springs, CO Metropolitan Statistical Area

References

External links

Peyton @ Colorado.com
El Paso County website

Census-designated places in El Paso County, Colorado
Census-designated places in Colorado